This is a list of electronic cigarette and e-cigarette liquid brands. , there were more than 460 e-cigarette brands worldwide. In 2014 it was reported that in every month there was a net growth of 10.5 e-cigarette brands. New e-cigarette brands are continuously being brought into the marketplace. , the exact number of e-liquid brands that are in business is unclear. , hundreds of manufacturing plants in China provide the electronic base for the e-cigarettes and export them worldwide, particularly to Europe and North America, where the devices are turned into packaged brands.

For the year of 2014, Chinese manufacturers were anticipated to produce more than 300 million e-cigarettes for the Europe and United States market, which are sold at places such as Walmart, 7-Eleven, gas stations, and vape shops. Around 90% of e-cigarettes sold worldwide are made in China, . Multinational tobacco firms who have penetrated the e-cigarette sector are manufacturing in China. Large e-cigarette companies in the US have started to relocate manufacturing to Europe or the US. The same can be said for multinational tobacco firms, . Some manufacturers and vendors in China are selling counterfeits of brand names and replicating designs of popular manufacturers.

1 

180 Smoke

2 

21st Century Smoke

5 

528 Custom Vapes

7 

777 eCigs

A 

Advanced Vapor Devices
Airship Nicsalt
Aleader X-Drip
Alt
Alternacig
Americig
Armageddon MFG
Apollo E-Cigs
Armageddon Squonk Box V2
Aromativ
Aspire
Augvape Druga 22 Squonk
AVAIL Vapor
Azure Vaping

B 

Bad Drip
Beard Vape
Ben Johnson's Morning Dew
Black Magic
Black Note
blu eCigs
Bombies After Dark
Bull Smoke

C 

Candy King Batch
Candy King on Salt
Candy King Sour Worms
Cigartex
Cigavette
Cigirex
Clearette
Cloud Alchemist Pod Refills
CoilART Mage
Cottien
CRFT

D 

Diamond Mist Eliquids
Dicodes
Direct eLiquid
Direct Vapor
Dongguan Wismec Electronics Co., LTD.
Dragonite International Limited
Dr. Salt
Durasmoke

E 

E-Burn
Ecigwizard
ECBlend Flavors
ECOpure
Eleaf
Electric Lotus
Electric Tobacconist
Electronic Cigarettes International Group Ltd
Element NS20
eGo
E-Lites
Enovap
Envii FITT
Eonsmoke
eTron 3T
Eversmoke
EZ Smoker

F 

Fantasia
Fifty-One
Fill My Pod
FIN
Finiti
Firebrand
Five Pawns
FuM
Fumare
Funkmaster

G 

Gamucci
Geek Vape
Gilla
Green Smart Living
Green Puffer
GeekVape Athena
Green Smoke

H 

Halo Cigs
Haus
HCigar VT Inbox DNA75
Hookah Stix
Hot Vapes

I 

iJoy Capo Squonk
Innokin
iPV Technology Co.
IQOS MESH
iVape IQ

J 

Jac Vapour
JAI
Juice Man
Juul
Johnson Creek
JoyeTech
J Vapes E-Liquid

K 

Kanger Lily
KangerTech
Kayfun v4
KandyPens
KiK
Kimsun
Kraken
KRAVE
Kush
Kwit Stick

L 

Level Up Vapor
Lite-Up Anywhere
Liberty Flights
LiQueen
Liquid Chronic
Liquid Nicotine Wholesalers
LOGIC (electronic cigarette)
Lost Art Liquids
Lost Vape
Lost Vape Orion GO
Lost Vape Orion Q
Lost Vape Therion BF DNA75C
Lung Hit

M 

Mad Vapes
Magic Mist
MarkTen
Mate 1
MESH
Mistic
Milkman
Mi-Pod
Mister E-Liquid
Modefined Lyra 200W
Motley Brew
Mountain Oak Vapors
Mountain Moon
Mr. Salt E
myblu
Myle
Myst Labs

N 

Nicocig
Nicolites
Nicotek
Nicquid
Nicvape
Nixteria
NJOY
Nude Nicotine
NutriCigs

O 

OBS
One Mad Hit Juice Box

P 

P1
Pancake Man
Patches by Candy Co.
Pink Sticks
Ploom
Pod Juice Loops
P.O.E.T. Electronic Nectar
Premium Ecigarettes
ProSmoke
ProVape
ProVari
Provog
Pure Cigs
Purilum

Q 

qmos

R 

Regal Cigs
Rejuve
River City Vapes
Russian 91%

S 

Salt Nix
Salty Man
Shenzhen Fest Technology Co., Ltd.
Sigelei
Sigelei Fuchai Squonk 213
Six Realms
Simply eLiquid
SKYCIG
SMOK
Smokeless Image
Smok-E Mountain
Smoke Star
SmokeStik
Smoking Everywhere
Smokio
SnowPlus
Solace
Solaris
Suicide Bunny
Suorin Air
South Beach Smoke
Space Jam Juice
STEEM
STIG

T 

TEROS
Texas Select Vapor
The Drip Factory
The Vapor Bar
The Vapor Chef
The Vapor's Knoll
Tinted Brew
Totally Wicked
Twirly Pop

U 

UWELL

V 

V2 Cigs
V2 Pro
Vandy Vape Pulse BF
VapCigs
VapeCo
Vape Craft
Vape Dinner Lady
Vape Heads Sour Smurf Sauce
Vapeleaf
VapeRev
VAPESTICK
Vapetek
Vaping Vamps
Vapor 123
Vapor4life
Vaporcade Jupiter
Vapor Cast Store
Vapor Couture 
Vaporesso
Vapor Couture
VaporFi
Vapor Group
Vapors Anonymous
Vapor Shark
VaporX
Vapour2
Vapouriz
Vapourlites
VERTX
VERTX Plus
Vethos Design
VGOD
VIP
Vivid Vapours
VMR Products
V'Nilla Cookies & Milk
Volcano eCigs
Volish
VUSE (electronic cigarette)
Vype

W 

Whip'd Strawberry
White Cloud Electronic Cigarettes
WISMEC
Wotofo Stentorian RAM
WOW Vapor

X 

XEO Void

Y 

Yami Salt
Yihi

Z 

Zandera
Zonk E Liquid
ZOOR

See also 

List of cigarette brands

References

External links 
 E-liquid Database—A Center for Tobacco Regulatory Science and Lung Health project, funded by NIH/FDA

Cigarette types
Electronic cigarettes